Laima Bernatavičiūtė (born 12 April 1985) is a former Lithuanian handballer who was member of the Lithuanian national team.

She signed to Egle Vilnius at the age of 15 and spent seven years with the Lithuanian record champions. In 2007, she switched to Hungarian side Alcoa FKC, where she joined fellow handball player Sonata Vijūnaitė. After three years, with 72 league matches under her belt, in which she scored 320 goals, she moved to CB Mar Alicante, with them she has won the silver medal of the EHF Cup Winners' Cup in 2011. Following this success, she changed her residence again and joined CJF Fleury Loiret HB in the French championship.

Achievements
EHF Cup Winners' Cup:
Finalist: 2011

Awards and recognition
 World University Championship Top Scorer: 2006
 MVP of the World University Championship: 2006
 Lithuanian Championship Top Scorer: 2007

References

1985 births
Living people
Lithuanian female handball players
Sportspeople from Kaunas
Expatriate handball players
Lithuanian expatriate sportspeople in Hungary
Lithuanian expatriate sportspeople in Spain
Lithuanian expatriate sportspeople in France
Lithuanian expatriate sportspeople in Norway
Fehérvár KC players